The Automobile Association of Kenya, often abbreviated AA Kenya is an independent motoring association that provides services to its members such as roadside assistance, driver training, motor vehicle valuation and car insurance brokerage. The AA Kenya is also an active voice in road safety related matters within Kenya and the region.

External links 
 http://www.aakenya.com
 http://www.aakenya.co.ke
 https://www.facebook.com/AAKenya
 https://twitter.com/AAKenya

Automobile associations
Transport organisations based in Kenya